Francesco Da Tolentino (active 1425 – 1435)  was an Italian painter. Born in Tolentino, he probably left there as a young man for Umbria, then went on to paint in Naples and elsewhere in Campania and Apulia, including Agro Nolano, Melfi, and Serracapriola. He painted a triptych for the Cathedral at Melfi. His work shows the influence, if not the mentorship, of Pietro Paolo Agabiti and Antonio Solario.

References

Year of birth unknown
Year of death unknown
15th-century Italian painters
Italian male painters
Italian Renaissance painters